Oak Hill Cemetery, located just north of downtown, is Birmingham, Alabama's oldest cemetery. Originally  on the estate of James M. Ware, it was already a burial ground by April 1869 when it served as the resting place for the infant daughter of future mayor Robert H. Henley. It was marked as "City Cemetery" on the original plats for Birmingham laid out by the Elyton Land Company and was formally sold to the city on December 29, 1873 for the sum of $1,073.50.

Most of the 10,000 or so burials at Oak Hill were interred before 1930, including nine of the ten landholders who founded the city, many early mayors, a Revolutionary soldier, numerous American Civil War veterans, and the first male child born in the city. Although few records exist from the time, most believe the "Potter's Field" section was also used as the final resting place for many victims of the 1873 cholera epidemic.

In 1889 Judge A. O. Lane purchased  on the southern slopes of Red Mountain (Birmingham, Alabama), now Lane Park, for the burial of paupers, thereby ending the use of Oak Hill's "Potter's Field". In 1928 the caretaker's cottage near the center of the property, was removed to the southwest corner of the cemetery and a new "Pioneer's Memorial Building" was constructed of Indiana limestone, designed by Miller & Martin Architects with William Kessler, landscape architect.

In 1977, Oak Hill Cemetery was added to the National Register of Historic Places. The Oak Hill Memorial Association keeps an office in the former caretaker's cottage and published a quarterly newsletter, the Oak Hill Pioneer, from Winter 1999 to Fall 2006, with articles about the history of the city in the context of the lives of those buried at Oak Hill.

Notable burials
 William S. Mudd (1816–1884), builder of Arlington Antebellum Home & Gardens
 Robert Henley, First mayor of Birmingham
 W. J. McDonald, acting mayor of Robert Henley
 Frank M. Dixon, Governor of Alabama
 Louise Wooster, famed Madam
 Mortimer Jordan, health care pioneer
 William Hugh Smith, Governor of Alabama 1868–1870
 Rucker Agee (1897–1985), banker and map collector
 Edmund Rucker, Confederate Army Colonel
 Charles Linn, industrialist and financier
 John T. Milner (1826–1898), railroad engineer, pioneer
 Henry F. DeBardeleben (18401910), industrialist and developed Bessemer
 Ellen Pratt DeBardeleben (1844–1894), daughter of Daniel Pratt
 James Sloss, railroad magnate, founder of Sloss Furnaces
 John William Tayloe (1831–1904), Confederate Army Major Jeff Davis Legion of Hampton's Division, Stuart's Cavalry, Army of Northern Virginia. Born  Buena Vista Plantation son of George Plater Tayloe, grandson of John Tayloe III of The Octagon House, great grandson of John Tayloe II of Mount Airy. Architect of Hawthorne
 Walter Henley, coal baron, banker, philanthropist
 F. B. Yielding (1864–1948), founder of Yielding department store chain
 Henry M. Caldwell, president of Elyton Land Company, owner of Peanut Depot building
 Arthur H. Parker (1870–1939), educator, namesake of A. H. Parker High School
 William E. B. Davis, pioneer gynecologist
 Frank P. O'Brien, manufacturer, mayor, industrialist, developer and opera-house owner
 Fred Shuttlesworth (1922–2011), civil rights leader

References

 Jeane, Gregory. "A Brief History of Oak Hill Cemetery". – accessed April 1, 2006

External links
 

Cemeteries in Birmingham, Alabama
Cemeteries on the National Register of Historic Places in Alabama
National Register of Historic Places in Birmingham, Alabama
Properties on the Alabama Register of Landmarks and Heritage
Tudor Revival architecture in Alabama
Cemeteries established in the 1860s